Owsley is an unincorporated community in eastern Johnson County, in the U.S. state of Missouri.

History
Owsley was originally called Eldorado, and under the latter name was laid out in 1886. A post office called Owsley was established in 1877, and remained in operation until 1906. The present name is after Moses Owsley, an early settler.

References

Unincorporated communities in Johnson County, Missouri
Unincorporated communities in Missouri